Male' Sports Complex (Ekuveni) is a multi-purpose stadium in Malé, Maldives. It is used mostly for football matches. Sports Complex in Male' consisting of indoor and outdoor basketball courts, tennis courts, two football fields, volley area, and cricket area. The Football Association of Maldives House, Offices of Maldives Basketball Association, Maldives Cricket Board, Athletics Association and Maldives Badminton Association are also located in this complex.

References

Football venues in the Maldives
Cricket grounds in the Maldives
Athletics (track and field) venues in the Maldives
Multi-purpose stadiums
Sport in Malé
Badminton venues